Jacob David Fuchsberg (June 14, 1913, Manhattan, New York City – August 27, 1995, Port Chester, Westchester County, New York) was an American lawyer and politician. He was elected to the Court of Appeals as an associate judge in 1974, and retired from the position in 1983.

Life
He graduated from New York University School of Law in 1936, and commenced practice as a trial lawyer in New York City. In 1938, he married Shirley Cohen, and they had four children.

From 1957 to 1959, he was President of the New York State Trial Lawyer Association, and from 1963 to 1964 President of the American Trial Lawyer Association (ATLA). From 1965 on, he was President of the Roscoe Pound-ATLA Foundation.

In 1973, he filed a petition to challenge the Democratic designees in a primary election to be nominated for Chief Judge of the New York Court of Appeals. He won the primary, but was defeated in the general election by Republican/Liberal Charles D. Breitel.

In 1974, he challenged again the Democratic designees in a primary election to be nominated for the New York Court of Appeals, and defeated Judge Harold A. Stevens. In the general election, he defeated again Stevens who ran on the Republican, Conservative and Liberal tickets, although the New York City Bar Association had urged the voters to defeat Fuchsberg. Fuchsberg was the first judge in the history of the Court to be censured by its members for misconduct. He resigned from the bench in May 1983, and resumed the practice of law in a firm with his children Rosalind and Alan.

He served on the Board of Trustees of New York University and Touro College. He assisted in the establishment of the Touro Law school which was named in his honor as "Touro College Jacob D. Fuchsberg Law Center."

On August 27, 1995, he felt dizzy at his home in Harrison, New York, and was brought by ambulance to the United Hospital in Port Chester where he died from cardiac arrest.

Family
He was "survived by his wife of 57 years," and their four children, ten grandchildren, and four great grandchildren. Fuchsberg's surviving siblings include a sister and three brothers, two of whom (Abraham and Seymour), with one another, are "partners in Fuchsberg & Fuchsberg."

References

Sources
The History of the New York Court of Appeals, 1932-2003 by Bernard S. Meyer, Burton C. Agata & Seth H. Agata (page 29)
Court of Appeals judges
Jacob D. Fuchsberg, 82, Dies; Lawyer and Appellate Judge in NYT on August 28, 1995
City Bar Unit, in Rare Act, Urges Fuchsberg's Defeat in NYT on October 25, 1974 (subscription required)

External links
The Jacob D. Fuchsberg Law Firm : The Fuchsberg Legacy
Touro College Jacob D. Fuchsberg Law Center

1913 births
1995 deaths
20th-century American Jews
Judges of the New York Court of Appeals
New York University School of Law alumni
People from Harrison, New York
People from Manhattan
20th-century American judges